Patryk Dudek (born 20 June 1992) is a Polish motorcycle speedway rider who is a member of the Polish national speedway team.

Career
Dudek's father, Sławomir, was a professional rider and Patryk gained his speedway licence in 2008. Dudek won 2009 and 2010 Team U-19 European Champion and 2009 Individual Under-21 Polish Champion titles. 

In September 2016, during the Speedway Grand Prix Qualification he won the GP Challenge, which ensured that he claimed a permanent slot for the 2017 Speedway Grand Prix. In 2017, he won the silver medal during the 2017 Speedway Grand Prix, having accomplished this during his debut season in the Speedway Grand Prix series, which makes him the most successful SGP rookie ever.

After finishing 12th during the 2020 Speedway Grand Prix season Dudek suffered a leg injury, which resulted in him missing the 2021 season. In 2022, he finished in 7th place during the 2022 Speedway World Championship, after securing 102 points during the 2022 Speedway Grand Prix season, which included winning the German Grand Prix.

Major results

World individual Championship
2016 Speedway Grand Prix - 17th
2017 Speedway Grand Prix - runner up (including Toruń grand prix win)
2018 Speedway Grand Prix - 9th (including Slovenian grand prix win)
2019 Speedway Grand Prix - 8th
2020 Speedway Grand Prix - 12th
2022 Speedway Grand Prix - 7th (including German grand prix win)

World team Championships
2016 Speedway World Cup - Winner
2017 Speedway World Cup - Winner
2018 Speedway of Nations - 3rd
2019 Speedway of Nations - runner up
2022 Speedway of Nations - 6th

European Championships 
 Individual U-19 European Championship
 2009 – Poland Tarnów – 5th place (10 pts)
 2010 – Croatia Goričan – 3rd placed (14+1 pts)
 Team U-19 European Championship
 2009 – Denmark Holsted – U-19 European Champion (2 pts)
 2010 – Czech Republic Divišov – U-19 European Champion (15 pts)

Domestic competitions 
 Team Polish Championship (League)
 2009 – for Zielona Góra
 Individual U-21 Polish Championship
 2008 – replaced in the Semi-final 2
 2009 – Poland Leszno – U-21 Polish Champion (13 pts + 1st in Run-Off)
 Team U-21 Polish Championship
 2008 – Poland Leszno – 4th place (8 pts)
 Silver Helmet (U-21)
 2008 – Poland Rzeszów – 13th place (3 pts)
 2009 – Poland Częstochowa – 5th place (10 pts)
 Bronze Helmet (U-19)
 2008 – Poland Gdańsk – 6th place (9 pts)
 2009 – Poland Wrocław – Runner-up (13 pts + 1st in Run-Off)
 2010 – Poland Leszno – Winner (15 pts)

See also 
 Poland national speedway team
 Speedway in Poland

References 

Polish speedway riders
1992 births
Living people
Team Speedway Junior European Champions
Sportspeople from Bydgoszcz